The Iadovi were an ancient Gallaecian Celtic tribe, living in the north of modern Galicia, around Viveiro's territory.

See also
Pre-Roman peoples of the Iberian Peninsula

External links
Detailed map of the Pre-Roman Peoples of Iberia (around 200 BC)

Tribes of Gallaecia
Galician Celtic tribes